André Forget is a Canadian writer, whose debut novel In the City of Pigs was longlisted for the 2022 Giller Prize.

Forget was born in Toronto, Ontario, and grew up in Mount Forest. He is a former editor of the literary magazine The Puritan.

In the City of Pigs grew out of a short story Forget wrote for a collaborative arts group led by his friend Joel Peters, on the prompt of an underwater organ. The full novel centres on Alexander Otkazov, a failed classical musician who moves to Toronto and becomes drawn into a shady real estate cabal.

References

21st-century Canadian novelists
21st-century Canadian male writers
Canadian male novelists
Canadian magazine editors
Franco-Ontarian people
People from Wellington County, Ontario
Writers from Ontario
Living people
Year of birth missing (living people)